Ernst Kyburz (14 August 1898 – 16 October 1983) was a Swiss freestyle wrestler who won gold medals at the 1928 Summer Olympics and 1931 European Championships in the middleweight category.

References

External links
 

1898 births
1983 deaths
Swiss wrestlers
Wrestlers at the 1928 Summer Olympics
Swiss male sport wrestlers
Olympic gold medalists for Switzerland
Olympic medalists in wrestling
Medalists at the 1928 Summer Olympics